Interactive Jack Records is a Seattle, Washington–based independent record label founded by Dave Flowers, who is also known for the founding of the Seattle multimedia firm Angerella Multimedia.  Interactive Jack Records was created for artists looking for an alternative to the mainstream music industry and thus encourages the artistic freedom of musicians while still providing business direction, marketing and promotion, and distribution for their artists :).

The current artist roster includes:
 Synthetic Summer
 Spiral Anne
 Tiger Finn
Dave Flowers
 Supaflower
 The Birds of Jubilation
 Devious Gray

See also 
 Twitter @interactiveJack

External links
 Official site

American independent record labels